The 2017 Council of the Isles of Scilly election took place on 4 May 2017 as part of the 2017 local elections in the United Kingdom. The council is a sui generis unitary authority within the ceremonial county of Cornwall.

The whole council of 16 members was be up for election, with twelve members elected in the St Mary's electoral division and another four from the 'Off Islands'; one each from Bryher, St Martin's, St Agnes and Tresco. The total number of councillors was being reduced from 21, with each island electing one councillor fewer than previously.

Candidates

22 candidates stood for election, with all candidates standing independently of any political party. Since only one candidate stood for each off island they were elected unopposed. 18 candidates stood for the remaining 12 seats on St Mary's.

|}

|}

|}

|}

|}

References

2017
2017 English local elections
2010s in Cornwall